Vaites or The Vaites is a district of Besançon, located to the northeast of the city.

References

External links
Écoquartier des Vaîtes

Areas of Besançon